Llandysilio is a small village and community in Montgomeryshire, Powys, Wales.

Its population at the 2001 Census was 962, increasing to 1,122 at the 2011 census.  The present parish church, dedicated to Saint Tysilio, dates from 1867 but tradition states that a church was founded here by Tysilio in the seventh century. The community includes the village of Four Crosses.

Robert Baugh (1748–1832), a Welsh surveyor, copper-plate engraver, map-maker and print-maker came from the towm; as did Rev. Elias Owen MA, F.S.A. (1833–1899), a Welsh cleric and antiquarian.

Governance
An electoral ward in the same name exists. This ward had a population of 1,789 at the 2011 Census.

References

External links 
Photos of Llandysilio and surrounding area on geograph

 

Villages in Powys
Communities in Powys